Matamoros is a municipality located in the Mexican state of Tamaulipas. Its municipal seat is the City of Matamoros.

Towns and villages

The largest localities (cities, towns, and villages) are:

Adjacent municipalities and counties

 San Fernando Municipality - south
 Río Bravo Municipality - southwest and northwest
 Valle Hermoso Municipality - west
 Hidalgo County, Texas - north
 Cameron County, Texas - north

Government

Mayors and municipal presidents

References

External links
Gobierno Municipal de Matamoros Official website

Municipalities of Tamaulipas